The 2022–23 Hong Kong Premier League (also known as the BOC Life Hong Kong Premier League for sponsorship reasons) is the eighth season of the Hong Kong Premier League, the top division of Hong Kong football.

Teams 
A total of 10 teams contest the league, including 8 teams from the 2021–22 Hong Kong Premier League and 2 teams promoted from the 2021–22 Hong Kong First Division.

Yellow denotes a newly promoted club entering the league this year.

Stadia and locations 

Primary venues used in the Hong Kong Premier League:

Personnel and kits

Managerial changes

Foreign players 
The number of foreign players teams can register is unlimited, with no more than 6 in the match squad and no more than 5 on the pitch during matches.

There are no restrictions on the number of foreign players that HKFC can register. However, the team must have at least nine Hong Kong players in the squad, with no less than three on the pitch during matches.

HK U23 is not allowed to register any foreign players. Meanwhile, the number of overaged players is restricted to five for the team, with no more than three on the pitch during matches. The rest of the players must meet the registration status of U23 local players.

League table

Results

Positions by round 
To preserve chronological evolvements, any postponed matches are not included to the round at which they were originally scheduled, but added to the full round they were played immediately afterwards. For example, if a match is scheduled for round 7, but then played between rounds 8 and 9, it will be added to the standings for round 8.

Fixtures and results

Round 1

Round 2

Round 3

Round 4

Round 5

Round 6

Round 7

Round 8

Round 9

Round 10

Round 11

Round 12

Round 13

Round 14

Round 15

Round 16

Round 17

Round 18

Season statistics

Top scorers

Hat-tricks 
Note: The results column shows the scorer's team score first. Teams in bold are home teams.

 5 Player scored 5 goals

Clean sheets

Match ball 
The chosen match ball for the 2022–23 Hong Kong Premier League is the Nike Flight football 22/23. The ball will be in use for all HKFA related competitions such as the Sapling Cup, Senior Challenge Shield and also the FA Cup.

Attendances

Awards

Monthly Most Valuable Player

Remarks

References 

Hong Kong Premier League seasons
Hong Kong
2022–23 in Hong Kong football